Yauri can mean:

Yauri, Nigeria, a local government area of Kebbi State
Yauri, Peru, a town in Cusco Region, Peru
Yauri Emirate, in Nigeria's Kebbi State